The 1992 United States Senate election in South Carolina was held on November 3, 1992. Incumbent Democratic U.S. Senator Fritz Hollings won reelection to his sixth (his fifth full) term. Apart from Hollings's first election to the Senate in 1966, this was the closest election of Hollings's Senate career.

Republican primary

Candidates
 Thomas F. Hartnett, former U.S. Representative from the 1st congressional district
 Charlie E. Thompson, teacher

General election

Candidates

Major
 Thomas Hartnett (R), former U.S. Representative
 Fritz Hollings (D), incumbent U.S. Senator

Minor
 Robert Clarkson (American)
 Mark Johnson (Libertarian)

Campaign
The race between Hollings and Hartnett was between two politicians from the Lowcountry.  Hartnett attacked Hollings for co-sponsoring a bill in 1983 that would have outlawed discrimination against homosexuals and Hollings shot back about questions of Hartnett's integrity for pushing for military contracts with a firm he had ties with in North Charleston.  The anti-incumbency mood helped to bring Hartnett close to topping Hollings in the general election, but South Carolina voters traditionally support their incumbent politicians and Hollings was elected for another six-year term, albeit with a much reduced margin.

Results

|-
| 
 | colspan=5 |Democratic hold
|-

See also
 List of United States senators from South Carolina
 1992 United States Senate elections

References
 
 

1992
South Carolina
1992 South Carolina elections